Milagros Nataly Arruela Patiño (born 11 October 1992) is a Peruvian footballer who plays as a defender. She was a member of the Peru women's national team. She is also a referee.

International career
Arruela played for Peru at senior level in two Copa América Femenina editions (2014 and 2018). She appeared at the 2019 Pan American Games as a referee and a fourth official.

References

1992 births
Living people
Women's association football defenders
Peruvian women's footballers
Footballers from Lima
Peru women's international footballers
Peruvian football referees
Women's association football referees
21st-century Peruvian women